Kensey may refer to:

 River Kensey, a river in east Cornwall, England
 Kensey Johns (judge) (1759–1848), American politician and judge
 Kensey Johns, Jr. (1791–1857), American politician

See also
 Kinsey (disambiguation)